The 1856 New South Wales colonial election was held between 11 March and 19 April 1856. This election was for all of the 54 seats in the New South Wales Legislative Assembly and it was conducted in 18 single-member constituencies, 13 2-member constituencies, two 3-member constituencies and one 4-member constituency, all with a first past the post system.

This was not a secret ballot and voters were required to write their name and address on the ballot paper.

Only men aged over 21 who owned at least a certain amount of land or had above a certain income, could vote. If a man fulfilled these requirements in multiple constituencies, then he was allowed to cast a vote in each. This was known as plural voting.

Indigenous men were allowed to vote in theory (there was no specific law against them voting), but in practice they were generally not aware of the process, not encouraged to enrol, and were mostly excluded and unable to participate in the election. In 1856, the Australian frontier wars were ongoing between various Aboriginal First Nations and the NSW government and colonists.

This was the first election held since the introduction of self-government in New South Wales. The resulting parliament, devoid of anything resembling party structure, ran for two weeks before Stuart Donaldson assumed the premiership, and struggled to deliver stable government during its term.

Key dates

Results

|}

See also
 Members of the New South Wales Legislative Assembly, 1856–1858
 Candidates of the 1856 New South Wales colonial election
 Results of the 1856 New South Wales colonial election

References

Elections in New South Wales
New South Wales Colonial Election, 1856
New South Wales Colonial Election, 1856
New South Wales Colonial Election, 1856
1850s in New South Wales